Onan is a person in the Biblical Book of Genesis. 

Onan may also refer to:

People 

 Onan Masaoka, an American Major League Baseball pitcher
 Onan Orlando Thom, a Guyanese swimmer who competed at the 2004 Summer Olympics
 Arzum Onan, a Turkish television actress
 Ömer Onan, a Turkish basketball player
 Ryan O'Nan, an American actor, writer, and director

Other uses 

 Ōnan, Shimane, a town in Japan
 Onan, Virginia, an unincorporated community in the U.S. state of Virginia
 Onan, a line of generators manufactured by Cummins Power Systems, a subsidiary of Cummins
 Onan (film), an Indian guerrilla film
 Onan, a canary owned by writer Dorothy Parker, so named because he constantly spilled his seed

See also 

 Onanism